The members of the fourth National Assembly of South Korea were elected on 2 May 1958. The assembly sat from 31 May 1958 until 28 July 1960.

Members

Seoul

Gyeonggi

North Chungcheong

South Chungcheong

North Jeolla

South Jeolla

North Gyeongsang

South Gyeongsang

Gangwon

Jeju

Notes

See also 

 1958 South Korean legislative election
 National Assembly (South Korea)#History

References 

004
National Assembly members 004